The 2007–08 CJHL season was the 47th season of the Central Junior A Hockey League (CJHL). The eleven teams of the CJHL played 60-game schedules.

In March 2008, the top teams of the league played down for the Bogart Cup, the CJHL championship.  The winner of the Bogart Cup competed in the Eastern Canadian Junior "A" championship, the Fred Page Cup.  If successful against the winners of the Quebec Junior AAA Hockey League and Maritime Hockey League, the champion would then move on to play in the Canadian Junior Hockey League championship, the 2008 Royal Bank Cup.

Changes 
 Kemptville 73's join league from Eastern Ontario Junior B Hockey League.

Final standings
Note: GP = Games played; W = Wins; L = Losses; OTL = Overtime losses; SL = Shootout losses; GF = Goals for; GA = Goals against; PTS = Points; x = clinched playoff berth; y = clinched division title; z = clinched conference title

(x-) denotes berth into playoffs, (y-) denotes elimination from playoffs, (z-) clinched division.

Teams listed on the official league website.

Standings listed on official league website.

2007-08 Bogart Cup Playoffs

Playoff results are listed on the official league website.

Fred Page Cup Championship
Hosted by the Weeks Crushers in New Glasgow, Nova Scotia.  Pembroke finished first in the round robin but lost the final.

Round Robin
Pembroke Lumber Kings 7 - Weeks Crushers (MJAHL) 1
Pembroke Lumber Kings 3 - Yarmouth Mariners (MJAHL) 2 OT
Sherbrooke Cougars (QJAAAHL) 2 - Pembroke Lumber Kings 1

Final
Weeks Crushers (MJAHL) 4 - Pembroke Lumber Kings 1

Scoring leaders 
Note: GP = Games played; G = Goals; A = Assists; Pts = Points; PIM = Penalty minutes

Leading goaltenders 
Note: GP = Games played; Mins = Minutes played; W = Wins; L = Losses: OTL = Overtime losses; SL = Shootout losses; GA = Goals Allowed; SO = Shutouts; GAA = Goals against average

Awards
 Most Outstanding Player - Nick Tremblay (Smiths Falls Bears)
 Scoring Champion - Nick Tremblay (Smiths Falls Bears)
 Rookie of the Year - Calvin de Haan (Kemptville 73's)
 Top Goaltender - Paul Beckwith (Pembroke Lumber Kings)
 Top Defenceman - Mark Borowiecki (Smiths Falls Bears)
 Top Prospects Award - Jacob Laliberte (Hawkesbury Hawks)
 Most Sportsmanlike Player - Chris Bryson (Pembroke Lumber Kings)
 Top Graduating Player - Stefan Lachapelle (Hawkesbury Hawks)
 Scholastic Player of the Year - Patrick Millette (Pembroke Lumber Kings)
 Coach of the Year - Sheldon Keefe (Pembroke Lumber Kings)
 Manager of the Year - Bill Bowker (Smiths Falls Bears)

Players taken in the 2008 NHL Entry Draft
 Rd 5 #139 Mark Borowiecki - Ottawa Senators (Smiths Falls Bears)
 Rd 6 #173 Nick Tremblay - Boston Bruins (Smiths Falls Bears)
 Rd 7 #209 Mike Bergin - Dallas Stars (Smiths Falls Bears)

See also 
 2008 Royal Bank Cup
 Fred Page Cup
 Quebec Junior AAA Hockey League
 Maritime Hockey League
 2007 in ice hockey
 2008 in ice hockey

References

External links 
 Official website of the Central Hockey League
 Official website of the Canadian Junior Hockey League

CJHL
Central Canada Hockey League seasons